is the debut extended play by Japanese band Chai, released on August 22, 2015. Originally a self-released album, it was later given a global digital release and a Japan-wide release in 2016. The extended play's leading promotional track "Gyaranboo" was a success in the United Kingdom, where it reached number 36 on Spotify's UK top 50 chart, without any promotion from the band.

Background and development 

Chai was formed in 2012 in Nagoya, Aichi Prefecture, by twins Mana and Kana alongside Yuna and Yuuki. Mana, Kana, Yuna are all from Nagoya, and were in the same class at high school. At first, Chai performed mostly around Nagoya and the surrounding prefectures. The band self-published the singles "Chai" (2013), "Kōsui (My Name Is Chai)" (2013) and "Chūburarin" (2014), and held a tour of central Japan in the summer holidays. By 2015, the band had started to perform more around the Tokyo area. The band decided to distance themselves from the music found on their earlier singles, due to the different musical direction to Hottaraka Series, which the band found too feminine and cute in retrospect.

Writing and production 

All of the songs on the album were composed by Mana, with Yuuki writing most of the lyrics, except for "Pichiku Pachiku Cuchiku" which had lyrics co-written by both Mana and Yuuki. "Meshimase Coffee" acts as a prologue to the extended play. "Gyaranboo" is a song centered around rhymes, that was inspired by Mana and Kana's father's abdominal hair (known colloquially in Japanese as ). "Nandamin to Total Care" is a song where the members profess their love for Mondahmin, a brand of mouth wash by Japanese company Earth Corporation. The title blends Mondahmin's brand name with a fanciful term , which Yuuki explains as people who can only say "what". "Total Care" is a marketing phrase associated with a similar product, Listerine. "Futae Center" is a song about a fictional factory, and "Pichiku Pachiku Cuchiku" was inspired by common misunderstandings women such as the members of Chai have.

Promotion and release 

Hottaraka Series was initially released exclusively to the website Ototoy, and as a tour exclusive CD. Chai held an album release tour called , featuring 10 dates mostly around Nagoya and the Tokyo area from August 22 to November 3.

"Gyaranboo" served as the leading promotional track from the album. Three music videos shot through the iPhone application Triller, starting with "Gyaranboo" in November 2015. This was the first music video produced through the application that was officially released by a band as a music video. "Nandamin to Total Care"'s music video was released in March 2016, and was shot as an ode to the mouth wash Mondahmin. The video has since been removed from YouTube.

Hottaraka Series was released globally in August 2016 to digital music stores and streaming services. During which, "Pichiku Pachiku Cuchiku" was promoted by the band, who created their third and final Triller self-produced music video for the song. During this global release, "Gyaranboo" reached number 36 on Spotify's UK top 50 chart, without any promotion from the band. To tie in with the wide digital release, a second Japanese tour was announced to promote Hottaraka Series:  held from July to September.

The album was given a wide release in Japan on December 7, which was promoted by a series of concerts called , held in Tokyo in November, and given a second season in February 2016, with performances in Tokyo and Osaka. Chai also performed at the Ki/oon Music-organised music event Slash in November 2015.

Critical reception 

CDJournal reviewers described the EP as "a succession of strange and chaotic songs, combining jazz and dance beat influences with an inconsistent progression, junk-like ensemble and coquettish mysterious vocals. The EP's appeal comes from its indescribable power and innocent ideas." Moe Tanaka of Rooftop the "addictive bass mixed with Mana and Kana's twin vocals" and the strong drums. She praised the band's "strong visuals", likening it to fusion cuisine. Hottaraka Series received praise from Japanese musicians such as Charan-Po-Rantan, Blue Encount and Akkogorilla.

Track listing 

Source for official romanzation:

Release history

References 

2015 EPs
Chai (band) EPs
Japanese-language EPs